The Aarewaage (in local Swiss German dialect: Woog) is a whirlpool phenomenon in the Swiss river Aare at Aarburg, canton of Aargau. In 1996, it was added to the Federal Inventory of Landscapes and Natural Monuments.

At the location of the Aarewaage, the river widens into a broader natural basin and at the same time meets a rock on which Aarburg Castle is located. The large whirlpool, the "Waage", is created by the main current of the Aare passing by calmer water in the basin, increasing its water level in cycles, further increased by part of the current being diverted by the castle rock and the influx of the two streams Tych and Dorfbach.

Several times, the existence or appearance of the Aarewaage was threatened by planned construction work. In the 1950s, an expansion of the Ruppoldingen hydroelectric power station that wasn't carried out would have destroyed the basin. In the 1970s, a railway bridge was planned at the Aarewaage, but due to landscape preservation concerns, a tunnel was constructed instead.

In December 2013, a part of the side wall at the Aarewage collapsed. The wall, which itself is a protected monument, was restored from April to May 2014.

References 

Aare
Aarburg
Whirlpools
Protected areas of Switzerland